Enssa is a 2004 Arabic music album by Moustafa Amar.

Charts

Track listing 
 "Enssa (Forget it)"
 "Alby Ya Sa'ban (Oh My Heart)"
 "Bgad (Really)"
 "El Hawa (The Love)"
 "Khaleek (Stay)"
 "Kefaya (Enough)"
 "Btehlam (You Dream)"
 "Kant Hbibty (She Was My Love)"
 "Mabihdash"
 "Lazet Ghadab (A Moment Of Anger)"
 "Hobak Nar (Your Love Is Like Fire)"
 "Tammeny"

Moustafa Amar albums
2004 albums
Arabic-language albums